Sphagnum capillifolium, the red bogmoss, northern peat moss, or small red peat moss, is a species of peat moss native to Canada, the northern United States, Greenland, and Europe. Small red peat moss can be distinguished by its sweeping, outward-curving branches that resemble tresses.

Description
Small red peat is a brownish-green to pinkish-red moss forming tight, carpet-like mounds. The leaves have no midrib and are tongue-shaped with a bluntly-pointed tip.

Gallery

References

capillifolium
Bryophyta of North America
Flora of the Great Lakes region (North America)
Plants described in 1780